Humphrey Berisford (probably died ca. 1588) was an English recusant who was imprisoned for his adherence to Roman Catholicism, dying in prison.

Biography
Christopher Green's 'F' manuscript, now in the English College, Rome, says of Berisford that he was a gentleman of Derbyshire, the son of an esquire, whose father was a Protestant, and that he studied at Douay for about two years.

Of Berisford's confession of faith, Green says that on his return from Douai, 

Joseph Gillow suggests that the word missed out by Green is "years" and states that Berisford died in Derby Gaol in about 1588.

References

History of Catholicism in England
1580s deaths
Year of birth unknown
16th-century English people
16th-century Roman Catholics
English people who died in prison custody
People from Derbyshire